John Robert Bell (June 12, 1922 – December 25, 2008) was an American college football coach and athletics administrator.
He served as the head football coach at Southwestern Louisiana Institute of Liberal and Technical Learning—now known as the University of Louisiana at Lafayette–in 1957 and at East Tennessee State University from 1966 to 1972.

Head coaching record

References

External links
 Tennessee State Hall of Fame

1922 births
2008 deaths
Georgia Tech Yellow Jackets football coaches
Louisiana Ragin' Cajuns athletic directors
Louisiana Ragin' Cajuns football coaches
East Tennessee State Buccaneers athletic directors
East Tennessee State Buccaneers football coaches
People from Scott County, Virginia